Ajoy Ghatak is an Indian physicist and author of physics textbooks.

Ghatak has written over 170 research papers and more than 20 books. His undergraduate textbook on Optics has been translated to Chinese and Persian and his monograph on Inhomogeneous Optical Waveguides (coauthored with Professor Sodha) has been translated to Chinese and Russian.

In 1995, he was elected Fellow of the Optical Society of America "for distinguished service to optics education and for his contribution to the understanding of propagation characteristics of gradient index media, fibers and integrated optical devices".

Education 
He received his M.Sc. from Delhi University and Ph.D. from Cornell University.

Career 
Ghatak joined the Indian Institute of Technology, Delhi in 1966. He retired as an Emeritus Professor of Physics at IIT Delhi in 2007

Ghatak is currently the President of the National Academy of Sciences, India. He also spends his time writing books and doing special guest lectures at universities and colleges in India and internationally. In recent years, he has taken a keen interest in bringing the genius of Albert Einstein to the wider public and was invited to present a TEDx talk, "Inside Einstein's mind" in 2017

Selected awards and honors 
 The Optical Society Sang Soo Lee Award (2020) "For his seminal role in the development of fiber optics and guided wave photonics and for pioneering optics education in India."
SPIE Educator Award (2008) "in recognition of outstanding contributions to optics education"
 Esther Hoffman Beller Medal (2003) of the Optical Society of America "for outstanding contributions to optical science and engineering education"
 Galileo Galilei Award (1998) of the International Commission for Optics "for outstanding contributions to the field of optics which are achieved under comparatively unfavorable circumstances"
 S. S. Bhatnagar Prize for Science and Technology – Physical Sciences (1979) of the Council of Scientific and Industrial Research "for significant work in the field of inhomogeneous optical wave-guides, theory of aberrations for optical systems comprising inhomogeneous media and self-focussing of laser beams"

Selected publications

References 

1939 births
Living people
Bengali physicists
Recipients of the Shanti Swarup Bhatnagar Award in Physical Science
Fellows of Optica (society)
20th-century Indian physicists
Scientists from Lucknow
Indian optical physicists